Cory Allen may refer to:
Cory Allen (musician) (born 1982), American musician, composer, record label owner
Cory Allen (rugby union) (born 1993), Welsh rugby union player

See also
Corey Allen (1934–2010), American film and television director, producer, writer and actor
Allen (surname)